Pachydermata (meaning 'thick skin', from the Greek , and ) is an obsolete order of mammals described by Gottlieb Storr, Georges Cuvier, and others, at one time recognized by many systematists. Because it is polyphyletic, the order is no longer in use, but it is important in the history of systematics. Outside strict biological classification, the term "" remains commonly used to describe elephants, rhinoceroses, tapirs, and hippopotamuses.
 
Cuvier's Pachydermata included the three families of mammals he called Proboscidiana, Pachydermata Ordinaria, and Solipedes, all herbivorous. They are now divided into the Proboscidea (represented among living species only by three species of elephants), the Perissodactyla (odd-toed ungulates, including horses, tapirs and rhinoceroses), the Suina (pigs and peccaries), the Hippopotamidae, and the Hyracoidea (hyraxes).

Thanks to genetic studies, elephants, rhinoceroses and hippopotamuses are classified as separate clades altogether. Rhinos, hippos, pigs, peccaries, horses, zebras, donkeys and tapirs are classified in clade Laurasiatheria, while elephants, hyraxes, manatees and dugongs are classified in clade Afrotheria.

Cuvier himself defined Pachydermata as "animals with hoofs, nonruminants", whereas Storr had described it as "mammals with hoofs with more than two toes". Cuvier added horses to the order. One naturalist, Delabere Pritchett Blaine, has speculated that: 

Although the former order of Pachydermata is often described as an artificial grouping of unrelated mammals, it was recognised by notable zoologists, including Charles Darwin, as a grade of hoofed mammals to the exception of other ungulates; and anatomical characters support the affinities of "pachyderm" mammals to each other and to other ungulates.

References

Obsolete mammal taxa